Defford railway station was a station in Defford, Worcestershire, England. The station was opened in 1840 and closed in 1965.

References

Further reading

Disused railway stations in Worcestershire
Railway stations in Great Britain opened in 1840
Railway stations in Great Britain closed in 1965
Former Midland Railway stations